Sheikh Tahir Jalaluddin (8 December 1869, Ampek Angkek, Agam, West Sumatra – 1956) was a famous Muslim ulama in Southeast Asia. 

He became the editor for Al-Imam publication which was published in Singapore between 1906 and 1908.

Sheikh Muhammad Tahir published two major treatises on astronomy: Natijatul'Umur (published 1357 H./ 1936 M.) and Kitab Jadual Pati Kiraan (published in 1362 H./ 1941 M.) -  logarithms for determining the direction of kiblat and times for prayer.

His son Tun Hamdan Sheikh Tahir was a Penang state governor (Yang di-Pertua Negeri) from 1989–2002.

References
 International IDEA, 2002, Women in Parliament, Stockholm (http://www.idea.int). This is an English translation.
 Sheikh Tahir Jalaluddin in publication. Google search.
 From malay concordance project.

1869 births
1956 deaths
People from Negeri Sembilan
Malaysian people of Minangkabau descent
Malaysian people of Indonesian descent
20th-century Muslim scholars of Islam